Title case or headline case is a style of capitalization used for rendering the titles of published works or works of art in English. When using title case, all words are capitalized, except for minor words (typically articles, short prepositions, and some conjunctions) that are not the first or last word of the title. There are different rules for which words are major, hence capitalized.
As an example, a headline might be written like this: "The Quick Brown Fox Jumps over the Lazy Dog".

Rules
The rules of title case are not universally standardized. The standardization is only at the level of house styles and individual style guides. Most English style guides agree that the first and last words should always be capitalized, whereas articles, short prepositions, and some conjunctions should not be. Other rules about the capitalization vary.

In text processing, title case usually involves the capitalization of all words irrespective of their part of speech. This simplified variant of title case is also known as start case or initial caps.

AP Stylebook 
According to the Associated Press Stylebook (2020 edition, 55th edition), the following rules should be applied:
 Capitalize the principal words.
 Capitalize prepositions and conjunctions of four letters or more.
 Lowercase the articles the, a, and an.
 Capitalize the first and last words (overrides the rules above).
 Capitalize the "to" in infinitives (e.g., I Want To Play Guitar).

Chicago Manual of Style 
According to the Chicago Manual of Style (15th edition), the following rules should be applied:
 Always capitalize "major" words (nouns, pronouns, verbs, adjectives, adverbs, and some conjunctions).
 Lowercase the conjunctions and, but, for, or, and nor.
 Lowercase the articles the, a, and an.
 Lowercase prepositions, regardless of length, except when they are stressed, are used adverbially or adjectivally, or are used as conjunctions.
 Lowercase the words to and as.
 Lowercase the second part of Latin species names.
 Lowercase the second word after a hyphenated prefix (e.g., Mid-, Anti-, Super-, etc.) in compound modifiers (e.g., Mid-year, Anti-hero, etc.).
 Always capitalize the first and last words of titles and subtitles (overrides the rules above).

Modern Language Association (MLA) Handbook 
According to the 9th edition of the Modern Language Association Handbook, the following title capitalization rules should be applied:

 Capitalize the first word of the title/heading and of any subtitle/subheading.
 Capitalize all major words (nouns, verbs including phrasal verbs such as "play with", adjectives, adverbs, and pronouns) in the title/heading, including the second part of hyphenated major words (e.g., Self-Report not Self-report).
 Do not capitalize articles, prepositions (regardless of length), and coordinating conjunctions.
 Lowercase the second word after a hyphenated prefix (e.g., Mid-, Anti-, Super-, etc.) in compound modifiers (e.g., Mid-year, Anti-hero, etc.).
 Do not capitalize "to" in infinitives (e.g., I Want to Play Guitar).

APA Style 
According to the 7th edition of the Publication Manual of the American Psychological Association, the following title capitalization rules should be applied:

 Capitalize the first word of the title/heading and of any subtitle/subheading
 Capitalize all major words (nouns, verbs including phrasal verbs such as "play with", adjectives, adverbs, and pronouns) in the title/heading, including the second part of hyphenated major words (e.g., Self-Report not Self-report)
 Capitalize all words of four letters or more.
 Lowercase the second word after a hyphenated prefix (e.g., Mid-, Anti-, Super-, etc.) in compound modifiers (e.g., Mid-year, Anti-hero, etc.).

American Medical Association (AMA) Manual of Style Capitalization Rules 
According to the 11th edition of the American Medical Association (AMA) Manual of Style, the following title capitalization rules should be applied:

 Capitalize the first and the last word of titles and subtitles.
 Capitalize nouns, pronouns, adjectives, verbs (including phrasal verbs such as "play with"), adverbs, and subordinate conjunctions (major words).
 Lowercase articles (a, an, the), coordinating conjunctions, and prepositions of four letters or fewer.
 Lowercase "to" in infinitives.
 Lowercase the second word in a hyphenated compound when it is a prefix or suffix (e.g., "Anti-itch", "world-wide") or part of a single word.
 Capitalize the second word in a hyphenated compound if both words are equal and not suffices or prefixes (e.g., "Cost-Benefit")
 Capitalize the first non-Greek letter after a lowercase Greek letter (e.g., "ω-Bromohexanoic")
 Lowercase the first non-Greek letter after a capital Greek letter (e.g., "Δ-9-tetrahydrocannabinol")
 Capitalize the genus but not the species epithet.

The Bluebook 
According to the 21st edition of The Bluebook, used for legal citations, the following title capitalization rules should be applied:

 Capitalize the first and the last word.
 Capitalize nouns, pronouns, adjectives, verbs (including phrasal verbs such as "play with"), adverbs, and subordinate conjunctions.
 Lowercase articles (a, an, the), coordinating conjunctions, and prepositions of four letters or fewer.
 Lowercase "to" in infinitives (though not defined in the stylebook).

Title case in references 
The use of title case or sentence case in the references of scholarly publications is determined by the used citation style and can differ from the usage in title or headings. For example, APA Style uses sentence case for the title of the cited work in the list of references, but it uses title case for the title of the current publication (or for the title of a publication if it is mentioned in the text instead). Moreover, it uses title case for the title of periodicals even in the references. Other citation styles like Chicago Manual of Style are using title case also for the title of cited works in the list of references.

See also 
 Sentence case
 Truecasing

References

Typography
Capitalization